A Day Will Come is a 1934 comedy film directed by Gerhard Lamprecht and Serge Véber and starring Käthe von Nagy, Jean-Pierre Aumont and Simone Héliard. It was made by the German studio UFA as the French-language version of Just Once a Great Lady.

The film's sets were designed by the art directors Otto Erdmann and Hans Sohnle.

Cast
Käthe von Nagy
Jean-Pierre Aumont as Henri de Langillier
Simone Héliard as Ria
Marfa d'Hervilly as Aunt Agathe
Claude May as Francine
Jacqueline Daix as Yvonne
José Sergy as André de Langillier
Charbonnier
Chartier
Gaston Dubosc
Gustave Gallet
Nono Lecorre
Félix Oudart
André Saint-Germain

References

External links

German comedy films
1934 comedy films
Films directed by Serge Véber
Films directed by Gerhard Lamprecht
UFA GmbH films
German multilingual films
German black-and-white films
1934 multilingual films
1930s German films